Police Point is a rural locality in the local government area of Huon Valley in the South-east region of Tasmania. The 2016 census has a population of 83 for the state suburb of Police Point.

History
Police Point was gazetted as a locality in 1971.

Geography
The shore of the Huon River estuary forms the north-eastern boundary.

Road infrastructure
The C638 route (Esperance Coast Road) enters from the north-east and follows the river to the south-east, where it exits. Route C637 (Police Point Road) starts at an intersection with C638 and runs south-west and north-west through the locality until it exits in the north-west.

References

Localities of Huon Valley Council
Towns in Tasmania